Lord Boyd may refer to:

 Lord Boyd of Kilmarnock, title in the Scottish peerage between 1454 and 1746
Robert Boyd, 1st Lord Boyd (died 1482) 
James Boyd, 2nd Lord Boyd  (c. 1469–1484) 
Alexander Boyd, 3rd Lord Boyd (died after 1508)
Robert Boyd, 4th Lord Boyd (died 1557 or 1558)
Robert Boyd, 5th Lord Boyd (c. 1517–1590)
Thomas Boyd, 6th Lord Boyd (c. 1547–1611)
Robert Boyd, 7th Lord Boyd (1595–1628)
Robert Boyd, 8th Lord Boyd (c. 1618–1640)
James Boyd, 9th Lord Boyd (died 1654)

 Colin Boyd, Baron Boyd of Duncansby (born 1953), former Lord Advocate for Scotland

See also
 Lord Boyd-Carpenter (1908-1998), British Conservative politician
 Lord Boyd-Orr (1880-1971), Scottish teacher, doctor, biologist and politician who received the Nobel Peace Prize